Boris Piotrovsky
 Mikhail Piotrovsky
 4869 Piotrovsky